My Name Is Khan is a 2010 Indian Hindi-language drama film directed by Karan Johar. The film features Shah Rukh Khan and Kajol in the lead roles with Jimmy Sheirgill, Zarina Wahab, Sonya Jehan, Vinay Pathak and Parvin Dabas playing supporting roles. Set in the United States, the film's story focuses on Rizwan Khan (Khan), a non-resident Indian with Asperger syndrome whose wife, Mandira (Kajol), has a child, Sameer, from a previous relationship. During the aftermath of the September 11 attacks, Sameer dies as a result of a racist assault by school bullies. Mandira blames Sameer's death on Rizwan due to his religion, and tells him not to come back until he can convince the President of the United States that he is not a terrorist. Rizwan takes Mandira's words literally and tries to meet the President so as to win her back. My Name Is Khan was co-produced by Johar's brother, Hiroo Yash Johar, and Khan's wife, Gauri Khan, under the Dharma Productions and Red Chillies Entertainment banners respectively. Shankar–Ehsaan–Loy composed the soundtrack while Niranjan Iyengar and Javed Akhtar wrote the lyrics for its songs. Ravi K. Chandran, Deepa Bhatia and Sharmishta Roy handled the cinematography, editing and production design respectively.

Produced on a budget of ₹850 million (about US$19 million in 2010), My Name Is Khan was released on 12 February 2010 and received positive reviews. It was commercially successful, grossing ₹2.048 billion (about US$45 million in 2010) worldwide. The film won 25 awards from 84 nominations; its direction, story, screenplay, performances of the cast members and music have received the most attention from award groups.

My Name Is Khan led the 56th Filmfare Awards with ten nominations including Best Film (Hiroo Yash Johar, Gauri Khan) and Best Music Director (Shankar–Ehsaan–Loy). It went on to win four including Best Director (Johar), Best Actor (Khan) and Best Actress (Kajol). The film won five awards out of eight nominations at the 12th IIFA Awards, including Best Director (Johar), Best Actor (Khan) and Best Lyricist (Iyengar for "Sajda"). It garnered fourteen nominations at the 6th edition of Producers Guild Film Awards, with Johar winning for Best Director. At the Zee Cine Awards 2011, the film earned six wins out of eight nominations, including those for Best Director (Johar) and Best Actor – Male (Khan). Among other wins, My Name Is Khan received four Stardust Awards, three Screen Awards, two Mirchi Music Awards and a BIG Star Entertainment Award.

Awards and nominations

Notes

References

External links 
 Accolades for My Name Is Khan at the Internet Movie Database

My Name Is Khan